Burr Gymnasium is a multi-purpose arena in Washington, D.C., which opened in 1963. It is home to the Howard University Bison men's and women's basketball teams and women's volleyball team. It is named after John Harold Burr Jr., chairman of the physical education department from 1923 to 1958. It has a seating capacity of 2,700.

The Burr Gymnasium Pool located in the gym is home to the men's and women's swimming and diving teams.

See also
 List of NCAA Division I basketball arenas

References

Howard Bison basketball
College basketball venues in the United States
College swimming venues in the United States
College volleyball venues in the United States
Basketball venues in Washington, D.C.
Swimming venues in Washington, D.C.
Volleyball venues in Washington, D.C.
1963 establishments in Washington, D.C.
Sports venues completed in 1963
Howard University buildings